Senator Hodges may refer to:

Asa Hodges (1822–1900), Arkansas State Senate
Charles D. Hodges (1810–1884), Illinois State Senate
Charles E. Hodges (1892–1968), West Virginia State Senate
George H. Hodges (1866–1947), Kansas State Senate
George Tisdale Hodges (1789–1860), Vermont State Senate
Kaneaster Hodges Jr. (born 1938), U.S. Senator from Arkansas
W. Randolph Hodges (1914–2005), Florida State Senate
William H. Hodges (born 1929), Virginia State Senate

See also
Senator Hodge (disambiguation)